Oscar Williams may refer to:
 Oscar Williams (poet), American anthologist and poet
 Oscar Williams (filmmaker), film actor, screenwriter and film director
 Oscar Williams (cricketer), Antiguan cricketer

See also
 Oscar Randal-Williams, British mathematician